This is a list of Djurgårdens IF Hockey players. Fredrik Bremberg has the record of most points during the Elitserien/SHL regular season with 501.

Goaltenders
Statistics are complete to the end of the 2014–15 SHL season.

Skaters
Statistics are complete to the end of the 2014–15 SHL season.

References
http://www.hockeydb.com/ihdb/stats/display_players.php?tmi=5508
https://web.archive.org/web/20141113111348/http://www.difhockey.se/klubb/historia/trojnummer
http://historical.stats.swehockey.se

 
Djurgardens IF Hockey